The Haut Conseil de l'éducation is a French body set up in 2005, in a consultative capacity as regards essential knowledge, educational programmes and the evaluation of exam results.

Education in France